Imaigal is a 1983 Indian Tamil-language film, directed by R. Krishnamoorthy and produced by Thiruppur Mani of Vivekananda Pictures. The film stars Sivaji Ganesan, Saritha, Sarath Babu and Sudarshan. It was released on 12 April 1983.

Plot 
Akbar Basha is a do-gooder fisherman and don protecting his fishing community against the evil rich man played by Sudarshan. Sudarshan's son cheats Saritha, impregnates her and leaves her. Akbar Basha takes her under his wing without knowing who cheated her for Sudarshan's son is a do-gooder himself and joins with Basha to provide legal aid. Basha also has vowed to kill whoever had cheated Saritha. Eventually, Sarath Babu is married and at a critical point, to save Akbar Basha, Saritha risks and loses the life of her child. 

In the end, when Akbar Basha finds out the truth, he goes to kill Sarath Babu who is saved by dying Saritha killing Akbar Basha to save her lover.

Cast 

Sivaji Ganesan as Akbar Baasha
Saritha
Sarath Babu
Sudarshan
Y. G. Mahendran
Goundamani
Manorama
V. Gopalakrishnan
Peeli Sivam
Rajyalakshmi
Jayamalini
Silk Smitha
Oru Viral Krishna Rao
Idichapuli Selvaraj

Soundtrack 
Soundtrack was composed by Gangai Amaran. The song "Madapuravo" is set in the Carnatic raga Mayamalavagowla.

References

External links 
 

1983 films
1980s Tamil-language films
Films directed by R. Krishnamoorthy
Films scored by Gangai Amaran